"Papa's Got a Brand New Pigbag" is an instrumental performed by British dance-punk band Pigbag. The instrumental was written by Chris Hamlin and James Johnstone before Pigbag was formed and produced by Dave Hunt and Dick O'Dell. In the United States, the instrumental was released as an import on the Rough Trade label, where it made it to number 56 on the US dance chart. A 1982 re-release of "Papa's Got a Brand New Pigbag" went to number three in the United Kingdom. Several covers of the instrumental have been released, including popular versions by Perfecto Allstarz and Thunderpuss.

The piece's title is a play on the James Brown song "Papa's Got a Brand New Bag". Whilst the track is well known for its brass riff, the bassline of the track was also ranked by Stylus Magazine at number 40 in their 2005 list of the "Top 50 Basslines of All Time".

Charts

Weekly charts

Year-end charts

Perfecto Allstarz version

On 23 January 1995, Paul Oakenfold released the track "Reach Up (Papa's Got a Brand New Pigbag)", credited to Perfecto Allstarz. This version went to number six in the United Kingdom, topped the UK Dance Chart, and also charted in Australia, Ireland, the Netherlands and Switzerland.

Critical reception
James Masterton stated in his weekly UK chart commentary, "The track has lost nothing with time, a glorious catchy soul-funk instrumental that looks set to dominate dancefloors just as it did 13 years ago." Pan-European magazine Music & Media wrote, "Britain's dance and remix culture started through Adrian Sherwood's productions of the Pop Group, to which family tree Pig Bag belonged. So recycling the 1982 instrumental "Papa's Got A Brand New Pig Bag" is only fair." James Hamilton from Music Weeks RM Dance Update described it as a "Pigbag's braying brass from 1982 driven now by bursts of Goodmen-ish percussion like Postflix's 'Rototom', in organ and 'reach up' divas prodded 136.2bpm [track]". 

Track listings
 12-inch, UK (1995) "Reach Up (Papa's Got a Brand New Pig Bag)" (Perfecto remix)
 "Reach Up (Papa's Got a Brand New Pig Bag)" (Indian Summer remix)
 "Zed's Dead"

 CD single, Europe (1995)'''
 "Reach Up (Papa's Got a Brand New Pig Bag)" (radio edit) – 3:40
 "Reach Up (Papa's Got a Brand New Pig Bag)" (Perfecto remix) – 7:02
 "Reach Up (Papa's Got a Brand New Pig Bag)" (Indian Summer remix) – 6:47
 "Zed's Dead" – 6:40

Charts

Weekly charts

Year-end charts

Certifications

Thunderpuss version
In 2001, Thunderpuss had a number-one dance hit on the US Hot Dance Club Songs chart when they covered the track.

Charts

In popular culture
 Used as the theme for the Citytv programme The NewMusic.
 Used as the "goal celebration" music at Middlesbrough and Queens Park Rangers football clubs.  When Shunsuke Nakamura played for Celtic, it became an unofficial theme tune for him. Fans would chant "Nakamura" over the last four notes of the main riff.
 In 1996-1998 music of this song was used in the Russian TV show   with Dmitry Nagiyev and Sergey Rost.
 Perfecto Allstarz' cover is used as the walk-on music for two-time Professional Darts Corporation World Champion Adrian Lewis.
 Featured as a backing track in series 2, episode 4 of the BBC drama Ashes to Ashes'', broadcast in 2009.
 British Gymnast Claudia Fragapane floor music 2015-2016.
 Molly Mccann at UFC Fight Night 208 led the crowd in a chant of "fuck the tories" using this riff. Alternatively this is used by opposition to the Conservatives this is also sung by Jamie Webster during his live shows

See also
 List of Billboard Hot Dance Music/Club Play number ones of 2001

References

1981 songs
1981 debut singles
1982 singles
1995 singles
2001 singles
1980s instrumentals
Dance-punk songs
English rock songs
East West Records singles
Fire Records (UK) singles
Perfecto Records singles
Rough Trade Records singles
UK Independent Singles Chart number-one singles